

Player awards (NBA)

Regular Season MVP 

 Larry Bird, Boston Celtics

NBA Finals MVP 

 Larry Bird, Boston Celtics

Slam Dunk Contest 

 Larry Nance, Phoenix Suns

Collegiate awards
 Men
John R. Wooden Award: Michael Jordan, North Carolina
Frances Pomeroy Naismith Award: Ricky Stokes, Virginia
Associated Press College Basketball Player of the Year: Michael Jordan, North Carolina
NCAA basketball tournament Most Outstanding Player: Ed Pinckney, Villanova
Associated Press College Basketball Coach of the Year: Ray Meyer, DePaul
Naismith Outstanding Contribution to Basketball: Ray Meyer
 Women
Naismith College Player of the Year: Cheryl Miller, USC
Wade Trophy: Janice Lawrence Braxton, Louisiana Tech
Frances Pomeroy Naismith Award: Kim Mulkey, Louisiana Tech
NCAA basketball tournament Most Outstanding Player: Cheryl Miller, USC

Naismith Memorial Basketball Hall of Fame
Class of 1984:
Jack Gardner
John Havlicek
Sam Jones

Births 
May 28 — Carmelo Anthony

Deaths
January 30 — Lloyd Sharrar, All-American college player (West Virginia) (born 1936)
March 3 — Jack Moore, American college player (Nebraska) (born 1959)
May 30 — Tex Gibbons, American Olympic gold medalist (1936) (born 1907)
November 21 — Ben Wilson, American high school player (born 1967)
December 11 — Nate Bowman, American NBA/ABA player (born 1943)

See also
 1984 in sports

References